Thistle Dew Dessert Theatre, founded in 1996, is community theater in Sacramento, California that claims to be the only American theater serving dessert with its theatrical productions.  The theatre was established by playwright Thomas Kelly.  The American Regional Theatre Association awarded the theatre a special citation for original work in 2009.

Laura Sheperd's play, Annie's Story, which premiered at the theatre, received an Elly Award for Best Original Script in 2008.

References

External links
 Thistle Dew Dessert Theatre

Theatres completed in 1996
Culture of Sacramento, California
Theatres in California
Theatre in California